Yu Peilun also spelled Yu Pei-lun (1887–1911) was a late Qing Dynasty revolutionary. During the Chinese Revolution of 1911, he was part of the Chinese students anti-monarchy "Dare to Die" corps of suicide bombers. Yu died in 1911, from detonating explosives while leading a suicidal charge against forces loyal to the Qing government.

Early life

University student

Chinese Revolution of 1911 and death

References

1887 births
1911 deaths
Qing dynasty people
Chinese revolutionaries
People from Neijiang